is a football (soccer) club based in Tsuno, a town of Koyu District, Miyazaki Prefecture in Japan. They play in the Kyushu Soccer League, which is part of Japanese Regional Leagues.

History
In March 2014, the head coach at Hosho Junior & Senior High School – Hiromi Matsuzaki – worked closely with Miyazaki Sangyo-keiei University to give Miyazaki a new team, someone which could try to climb Japanese football's pyramid. The previous most-known club Estrela Miyazaki dissolved in 2009 and the region needed a new football face, since Miyazaki is one of the few prefecture to not host a professional football team in Japan.

J.FC Miyazaki (the "J" stands for "jump" to the J. League) immediately raised their level, conquering a spot in Kyushu Soccer League and qualifying to 2015 Emperor's Cup 1st round, after defeating home-rivals Tegevajaro Miyazaki. Giravanz Kitakyushu defeated J.FC Miyazaki, 2–1, in a tight match.

After winning the 2016 title, the club now hopes to reach professional football as soon as they can.

In 2020, the club was moved from Miyazaki to Tsuno. And their name was changed to Veroskronos Tsuno from 2021 season.

League and cup record

Key

Honours
Miyazaki Prefectural League
Champions: 2014
Kyushu Soccer League
Champions: 2016
Champions: 2018

Current squad

Historical Badges

References

External links
  

Football clubs in Japan
Sports teams in Miyazaki Prefecture
Association football clubs established in 2014
2014 establishments in Japan